Oerlikon may refer to:

Companies
OC Oerlikon (former Unaxis), a Swiss technology conglomerate, or one of its business units:
 Oerlikon Solar
 Oerlikon Balzers
 Oerlikon Leybold Vacuum
Oerlikon-Bührle, a company in Zürich, Switzerland that used to own Bally Shoe, Oerlikon Contraves, Pilatus Aircraft and Britten-Norman Aircraft; see Fairey Aviation Company
Maschinenfabrik Oerlikon, the Oerlikon subsidiary later became Oerlikon-Bührle, and is now part of Asea Brown Boveri
Oerlikon Contraves, a Swiss anti-aircraft artillery manufacturer founded in Zürich Oerlikon
Oerlikon KBA, a 25 mm cannon
Oerlikon 20 mm cannon, an anti-aircraft cannon
Oerlikon 35 mm twin cannon, an anti-aircraft cannon

Other uses
Oerlikon (Zürich), a district in the northern part of Zürich, Switzerland
Zürich Oerlikon railway station located in Zürich
Oerlikon, a world in M. A. Foster's "The Morphodite Trilogy"